Ikurō, Ikuro, Ikuroh or Ikurou (written: 郁郎 or 幾郎) is a masculine Japanese given name. Notable people with the name include:

, Japanese musician
 (1892–1981), Japanese botanist
 (1910–1973), Japanese religious leader

Japanese masculine given names